Sisyrinchium striatum, common names pale yellow-eyed-grass or satin flower, is an evergreen perennial plant in the family Iridaceae.

Description
It has an erect stem with a clump of grey-green sword-shaped alternate leaves and several clusters of cup-shaped creamy white flowers with six tepals and golden centers. They bloom from May to June.

Distribution
This species is native to Argentina and Chile. It grows in alpine grasslands, open woods and meadows.

References

 Christoper Brickell (Editor-in-chief): RHS A-Z Encyclopedia of Garden Plants. Third edition. Dorling Kindersley, London 2003, .
 Missouri Botanical Garden
 Hortipedia

striatum
Flora of Argentina
Flora of Chile
Plants described in 1792